Morro Castle may refer to:

Fortress
 Morro Castle (Havana), a fortress guarding Havana Bay, Cuba
 Castillo San Felipe del Morro, a fortress in San Juan, Puerto Rico
 Castillo de San Pedro de la Roca, also called "Castillo del Morro" ("Morro Castle"), a fortress guarding Santiago, Cuba

Ship
 SS Morro Castle (1900), passenger liner of the Ward Line
 SS Morro Castle (1930), passenger liner that burnt in 1934

See also
 Morro (disambiguation)